

Fixed (landline) codes
Area codes in Afghanistan are two digits long. It is common to write phone numbers as (0xx) yyy-yyyy, where xx is the area code. The 0 prefix is for long-distance dialing from within the country. International callers should dial +93 xx yyyyyyy.

Area codes for common cities are:
094 xx  yyyyyyy: Afghanistan
020 yyy yyyy: Kabul
026 yyy yyyy: Daykundi
030 yyy yyyy: Kandahar
040 yyy yyyy: Herat
050 yyy yyyy: Mazar-i-Sharif
060 yyy yyyy: Jalalabad
070 yyy yyyy: Gardez

Mobile phone codes
There are six mobile phone companies currently operating in Afghanistan. Mobile phone numbers are written as (0xx yyy-yyyy), where xx is the code. The 0 prefix is for dialing from within the country. International callers should dial +93 xx yyy yyyy.

Some of the mobile phone codes are:

AWCC
070 yyy yyyy
071 yyy yyyy

Roshan (TDC)
079 yyy yyyy
072 yyy yyyy

Etisalat Afghanistan
078 yyy yyyy
073 yyy yyyy

MTN Afghanistan
077 yyy yyyy
076 yyy yyyy

Salaam
074 yyy yyyy

 Afghan Telecom (CMDA)
075 yyy yyyy

Wasl
07* yyy yyyy

See also
 Communications in Afghanistan
 Mobile Network Code

References

External links
Afghanistan country and area codes
Afghanistan Ministry of Communications and Information Technology

Afghanistan
Telephone numbers